The Slovenian Democratic Union (acronym SDZ) was a Slovene liberal political party, active between 1989 and 1991, during the democratization and the secession of the Republic of Slovenia from Yugoslavia.

History
The party was founded on 11 January 1989 in the Cankar Hall in Ljubljana, and Dimitrij Rupel was elected as its president. It was one of the first political party established in opposition to the Communist regime. It was founded mostly by intellectuals around the alternative journal Nova revija and it was initially called Slovenian Democratic Union of Reason.

In December 1989, it joined the Democratic Opposition of Slovenia, together with the Social Democratic Party of Slovenia, the Slovene Christian Democrats, the Slovenian People's Party and the Greens of Slovenia. In April 1990, the coalition won the first free elections in Slovenia after World War II, gaining around 55% of the popular vote. The Slovenian Democratic Union received around 9,5% of the vote, becoming the third largest party in the coalition and the fifth in the Slovenian National Assembly. Despite the relatively modest result, members of the party covered several key positions in the new cabinet led by the Christian Democrat Lojze Peterle, such as the Ministry of Interior, Defence, Justice, Information. Besides, the party member France Bučar was elected president of the Slovenian parliament.

After the independence of Slovenia, the party split into two. Its left liberal wing, led by the president Dimitrij Rupel, founded the Democratic Party, while the conservative wing, led by the minister of justice Rajko Pirnat established the centre-right National Democratic Party. In the election of 1992, both parties suffered a defeat. The Democratic Party gained 5,01% of the popular vote, and in 1994, most of its members joined the Liberal Democracy of Slovenia. The National Democratic Party obtained 2,18% of the vote and no seats in Parliament. In 1993, the National Democrats joined the Slovene Christian Democrats, and in 1995 they switched to the Slovenian Social Democratic Party.

Despite its relatively small popular support, the Slovenian Democratic Union was one of the most influential parties in Slovenia between 1988 and 1991. After its dissolution, its former members have become influential members of other political formations.

The legal successors of the Slovenian Democratic Union are the Slovenian Democratic Party and the Liberal Democracy of Slovenia.

Prominent members 
Dimitrij Rupel
Jelko Kacin
Janez Janša
Igor Bavčar
France Bučar
Tine Hribar
Spomenka Hribar
Peter Jambrek
Rudi Šeligo
Veno Taufer
Ivo Urbančič
Peter Vodopivec
Tone Peršak

See also 
Contributions to the Slovenian National Program
Committee for the Defence of Human Rights

See also
Liberalism in Slovenia

1989 establishments in Slovenia
1991 disestablishments in Slovenia
Defunct liberal political parties
Defunct political parties in Slovenia
Liberal parties in Slovenia
Organizations based in Ljubljana
Organizations of the Revolutions of 1989
Political history of Slovenia
Political parties disestablished in 1991
Political parties established in 1989
Pro-independence parties
Slovenian Spring